Robert Christian Klein Madsen (13 December 1882 – 24 September 1954) was a Danish gymnast who competed in the 1906 Intercalated Games and the 1908 Summer Olympics.

At the 1906 Intercalated Games in Athens, he was a member of the Danish gymnastics team, which won the silver medal in the team, Swedish system event. Two years later he was part of the Danish team, which finished fourth in the team competition.

References

External links 
 
 

1882 births
1954 deaths
Danish male artistic gymnasts
Olympic gymnasts of Denmark
Olympic silver medalists for Denmark
Medalists at the 1906 Intercalated Games
Gymnasts at the 1906 Intercalated Games
Gymnasts at the 1908 Summer Olympics